Canadian Passenger Association
was an association of railway companies serving Canada that authorized and administered discount rail fares for travel to conventions or special events  or to certain categories of traveller, such as commercial travellers, clergy, charitable workers. The association's functions "relate[d] mainly to tariffs and ticket regulations."

Similar associations operated in the United States prior to the creation of Amtrak.

References

Transport associations in Canada
Rail transport in Canada
Railway associations